Eater of Wasps is a BBC Books original novel written by Trevor Baxendale and based on the long-running British science fiction television series Doctor Who. It features the Eighth Doctor, Fitz and Anji.

External links

2001 British novels
2001 science fiction novels
Eighth Doctor Adventures
Novels by Trevor Baxendale